Berea may refer to:

Places

Greece
 Beroea, a place mentioned in the Acts of the Apostles, now known as Veria or Veroia

Lesotho
 Berea District

Romania
 Berea, a village in Ciumești Commune, Satu Mare County
 Berea, a tributary of the Valea Neagră in Satu Mare County

South Africa
 Berea, Durban
 Berea, Gauteng

United States
 Berea, Iowa
 Berea, Kentucky
 Berea, Baltimore, Maryland
 Berea, Nebraska
 Berea, North Carolina, an unincorporated community in Granville County
 Berea, Ohio
 Berea, South Carolina
 Berea, Giles County, Tennessee
 Berea, Warren County, Tennessee
 Berea, Virginia
 Berea, West Virginia

Other uses 
 Helena Espinosa Berea (c. 1895 – c. 1960), Mexican academic
 Berea College, in Berea, Kentucky
 Berea International Theological Seminary, Seoul, South Korea
 Berea Sandstone, a type of sandstone named for Berea, Ohio
 Berea (genus), a genus of parasitic copepods in the family Chondracanthidae

See also 
 Aleppo, Syria, known as Beroea (Βέροια) in antiquity
 Bereans, inhabitants of the biblical city of Berea